Kora Karvouni (born 22 April 1980 in Athens, Greece) is a Greek stage and television actress. She graduated from the Greek National Theatre Drama School with a distinction in 2002. She has performed in various theatre productions in Greece, U.S.A., South Korea and Italy collaborating with notable directors such as Peter Stein, Anatoly Vasiliev, Dimiter Gotscheff and Laurent Chétouane. She has also participated in Greek television productions.

Stage Credits
2002-2003: Patras Municipal and Regional Theatre: Cyrano de Bergerac by Edmond Rostand, direction: Niketi Kontouri
2003: National Theatre of Greece: Medea by Euripides, direction: Stathis Livathinos (performed in Epidaurus and other Greek stages)
2004: Theatro tou Neou Kosmou: The Lieutenant of Inishmore by Martin McDonagh, direction: Vaggelis Theodoropoulos
2004: National Theatre of Greece: Hippolytus by Euripides, direction: Vassilis Nikolaidis (performed in Epidaurus and other Greek stages)
2005: Theatro tou Neou Kosmou: Woyzeck by Georg Büchner, direction: Vaggelis Theodoropoulos
2005: National Theatre of Greece: The Bacchae by Euripides, direction: Sotiris Hatzakis (performed in Epidaurus and other Greek stages)
2005-2007: Theatro tou Neou Kosmou: The Sexual Neuroses of Our Parents by Lukas Bärfuss, direction: Vaggelis Theodoropoulos
2006: Theatro tou Neou Kosmou and Athens and Epidaurus Festival: Othello by William Shakespeare, direction: Vaggelis Theodoropoulos
2007: National Theatre of Greece and Athens and Epidaurus Festival: Elektra by Sophokles, direction: Peter Stein
2008: Patras Municipal and Regional Theatre: Medea by Euripides, direction: Anatoly Vasiliev
2008: National Theatre of Greece: The Diary of a Scoundrel by Alexander Ostrovsky, direction: Yannis Kakleas
2009: National Theatre of Greece: The Nightmare of Happiness by Justine del Corte, direction: Yannis Houvardas 
2009: National Theatre of Greece and Athens and Epidaurus Festival: The Persians by Aeschylus, direction: Dimiter Gotscheff
2010: National Theatre of Greece: Marat/Sade by Peter Weiss, direction: Efi Theodorou 
2010: National Theatre of Greece: Leonce and Lena by Georg Büchner, direction: Laurent Chétouane
2010:National Theatre of Greece: Orestes by Euripides, direction: Yannis Houvardas 
2010-2011: Theatro Odou Kefallinias: The House of Bernarda Alba by Federico García Lorca, direction: Stathis Livathinos 
2011: Athens and Epidaurus Festival: The Throne of Atreus by Aris Retsos, direction: Aris Retsos

Television Credits
2009: "Karyotakis" (ET1), direction: Tassos Psarras
2009: "Agria Paidia" (MEGA Channel), direction: Christos Nikoleris
2008: "10" based on the novel of M. Karagatsis (Alpha Channel), direction: Pigi Dimitrakopoulou
2007: "Amina Zonis" based on the novel of Petros Markaris (NET), direction: Fillipos Tsitos
2015: "10i Entoli" (Alpha Channel), direction: Panos Kokkinopoulos

Cinema Credits
2010: "Tungsten", direction: Giorgos Georgopoulos 
2011: J.A.C.E.
2013: September

Nominations and awards
2007: Nominated for the Melina Mercouri Award
2006: Won the Best Actress Award of Athinorama Magazine
2014: Won the Best Actress Award of Hellenic Film Academy for September

References

External links
 

1980 births
Actresses from Athens
Greek actresses
Greek stage actresses
Living people
Theatre in Greece